Dewanhat Mahavidyalaya, established in 2007, is general degree college in Dewanhat. It is in Cooch Behar district. It offers undergraduate courses in arts. It is affiliated to  Cooch Behar Panchanan Barma University.

Departments

Arts
Bengali
English
History
Education
Political Science
Philosophy
Geography
Sanskrit

See also

References

External links 
dewanhat mahavidyalaya

Universities and colleges in Cooch Behar district
Colleges affiliated to Cooch Behar Panchanan Barma University
Academic institutions formerly affiliated with the University of North Bengal
Educational institutions established in 2007
2007 establishments in West Bengal